Dressed for the Occasion may refer to:

 Dressed for the Occasion (The Mitchell Brothers album)
 Dressed for the Occasion (Cliff Richard album)